Deanna Stellato-Dudek (born June 22, 1983) is an American pair skater who currently competes with Maxime Deschamps for Canada. With Deschamps, she is the 2023 Four Continents bronze medalist, 2022 Grand Prix de France champion, 2022 Skate America silver medalist, 2022 CS Nebelhorn Trophy champion, and 2023 Canadian national champion.

Competing for the United States with her former skating partner, Nathan Bartholomay, she is the 2018 CS Ondrej Nepela Trophy silver medalist, the 2018 CS Nebelhorn Trophy bronze medalist, the 2018 CS Golden Spin of Zagreb bronze medalist, and a two-time U.S. national bronze medalist (2018–2019).

Stellato-Dudek originally competed in ladies' singles and won one senior international medal – silver at the 2000 Karl Schäfer Memorial. Earlier in her career, she won silver at the 2000 World Junior Championships and gold at the 1999–20 Junior Grand Prix Final.

Personal life 
Stellato was born June 22, 1983, in Park Ridge, Illinois. She is a licensed aesthetician and permanent cosmetic professional. She has worked as the director of aesthetics at the Geldner Center in Chicago. She married a consultant, Michael Dudek, in 2013.

Single skating 
Stellato began learning to skate as a five-year-old. In the 1999–2000 season, she won the ISU Junior Grand Prix Final and went on to win the silver medal at the 2000 World Junior Championships. A member of Wagon Wheel FSC, she was coached by Cindy Watson-Caprel and Philip Mills in Northbrook and Buffalo Grove, Illinois.

Stellato began the following season at a U.S.-only team event, the 2000 Keri Lotion Classic, where she was partnered with Michael Weiss. She received a 6.0 for presentation. Making her senior international debut, she won silver at the 2000 Karl Schäfer Memorial in October. In November, she finished fifth at a Grand Prix event, the 2000 Skate Canada International, where she injured her right hip before the free skate. After returning to training two weeks later, Stellato sustained a pulled hip flexor in the same hip, which led to her withdrawal from the 2001 U.S. Championships. She later decided to retire from competition. Due to four different hip injuries, she had skated for approximately 24 months in four years. Other injuries in her career included a torn ligament in her right ankle and a fractured left ankle.

Pair skating

Partnership with Bartholomay 
Following her retirement from competitive skating, Stellato studied and began a career as an aesthetician. While attending a work retreat, a team-building exercise prompt, "what is something you'd do if you knew you couldn't fail?" inspired her to revive her interest in skating. She resumed skating in March 2016, in the Chicago area, before visiting her former coach, Cindy Watson-Caprel, who had moved to a rink in Ellenton, Florida. In Florida, U.S. Figure Skating's high-performance director, Mitch Moyer, suggested a tryout with Nathan Bartholomay, a pair skater who was working at the same rink. In July 2016, Stellato and Bartholomay announced that they had formed a partnership and were based at the Ellenton Ice and Sports Complex. Coached by Jim Peterson, they trained on ice three hours a day, five days a week.

2016–17 season
Making their international debut together, the Stellato/Bartholomay placed sixth at the 2016 CS Golden Spin of Zagreb. After taking the gold medal at the Eastern Sectional Championships, they qualified for the 2017 U.S. Championships where they finished in fourth place, earning the pewter medal.

2017–18 season
Stellato/Bartholomay began the season with two Challenger assignments, finishing sixth at both the 2017 CS U.S. Classic and the 2017 CS Finlandia Trophy. They were then invited to make their Grand Prix debut as a team, finishing eighth of eight teams at the 2017 Skate America. 

Stellato and Bartholomay won the bronze medal at the 2018 U.S. Championships. This earned them an assignment to the 2018 Four Continents Championships, where they finished fifth. Upon the withdrawal of national silver medalists Kayne/O'Shea from the 2018 World Championships, Stellato/Bartholomay were called up to replace them on the team. They finished seventeenth in the short program, missing the cut from the free skate segment. Stellato said that she hoped to compete until at least the 2022 Winter Olympics in Beijing, remarking, "I've had a 16-year vacation; I can go another four."

2018–19 season
Stellato/Bartholomay opened the 2018–19 figure skating season with two Challenger events, winning silver at the Nepela Trophy and bronze at Nebelhorn Trophy. They placed sixth at the 2018 Grand Prix of Helsinki and had to withdraw from the 2018 Rostelecom Cup. Competing in a third Challenger event, they won another bronze medal at the 2018 CS Golden Spin of Zagreb. 

Stellato/Bartholomay won a second consecutive bronze medal at the 2019 U.S. Championships. However, due to perceived inconsistent results earlier in the season, they were not assigned to the third American berth at the 2019 Four Continents Championships, that going instead to pewter medalists Kayne/O'Shea. Coach Jim Peterson  said afterward "we are disappointed, what can I say? We are the U.S. bronze medalists. We defeated Kayne and O'Shea at nationals."

The national championships would be the team's final competition, as they announced in April 2019 that injuries to Bartholomay precluded them from continuing together.

Partnership with Deschamps 
Following the end of her partnership with Bartholomay, Stellato returned to Chicago and continued training by herself while seeking a new partner, later saying, "I called every single coach I’d ever met in my entire life to see if they had anyone available." Upon learning of Canadian pair skater Maxime Deschamps, she arranged a tryout in Montreal overseen by coach Bruno Marcotte, and they shortly after formed a new partnership. Given the difficulty of obtaining Canadian citizenship, Stellato said that her goal was to compete at the 2026 Winter Olympics, joking, "I'm already too old to be doing this, so I can be too old in six years, too. So what's the difference?" The new partnership first came to public notice when they appeared on the entry list for the Souvenir Georges-Éthier domestic competition. Following Marcotte's relocation to Ontario, they were coached by Ian Connolly and later Josée Picard.

2019–20 season 
Stellato was not initially released to compete internationally by the American federation, so the team appeared only domestically in the 2019–20 season. Stellato/Deschamps won the Quebec sectional qualifying event before taking bronze at Skate Canada Challenge to qualify for the 2020 Canadian Championships. However, Stellato sustained a hamstring injury in the leadup to the event, hampering their progress. They placed sixth in their national championship debut.

2020–21 season 
With the onset of the COVID-19 pandemic, the international and domestic seasons were largely curtailed. Stellato/Deschamps repeated their previous season's sectionals and Challenge results, but the 2021 Canadian Championships were cancelled.

2021–22 season 
After securing her release from the USFS, Stellato/Deschamps debuted internationally at the 2021 CS Autumn Classic International, placing fourth, ahead of Bartholomay and his new partner Katie McBeath. They were given a second Challenger event, the 2021 CS Warsaw Cup, where they finished in sixth place.

Deschamps contracted COVID-19 in the leadup to the 2022 Canadian Championships, as a result of which they were only able to resume training a week beforehand. They won the bronze medal, their first national podium, with Stellato saying, "we feel really happy. We fought for every element in that program, so we are happy to be here." Stellato/Deschamps went on to finish fourth at the 2022 Four Continents Championships.

2022–23 season 
The beginning of the new Olympic cycle saw a significant shift in the international pairs scene as a result of retirements and the banning of all Russian competitors due to the Russo-Ukrainian War. Stellato/Deschamps won the gold medal at the 2022 CS Nebelhorn Trophy. This was Stellato's first international title in 22 years. They also shared with the rest of the Canadian delegation the Fritz Geiger Memorial Trophy for the highest-ranked country at the event. 

The team was then invited to make their Grand Prix debut at the 2022 Skate America and won the silver medal, only 3.5 points behind gold medalists Knierim/Frazier. This was the first Grand Prix medal for both skaters. Stellato also became the oldest Grand Prix medalist in history. They travelled to Angers for the 2022 Grand Prix de France, their second Grand Prix event, and won the gold medal. This was the first Grand Prix win for both skaters and made her, at age 39, the oldest skater to win a Grand Prix event. Their results qualified them for the Grand Prix Final. Stellato/Deschamps entered the event considered likely bronze medalists and placed third in the short program, distantly behind top-ranked teams Knierim/Frazier and Japan's Miura/Kihara and 2.04 points of Italians Conti/Macii. Stellato said she was pleased by the result, revealing that she had "got really ill" in recent weeks and "had to take time off the ice and off the training, and I lost weight, and I lost muscles, so we were training very hard to try and be ready for here." However, the team struggled in the free skate, placing fifth in that segment and dropping behind the Italians for fourth overall. She called this a disappointment but said it was understandable in light of their training difficulties.

Stellato continued to experience health difficulties in the aftermath of the Final, presumed to be a result of respiratory syncytial virus infection, which made her unable to breathe through her mouth. She had limited medical options for dealing with the virus given the need to remain compliant with WADA guidelines. Despite these difficulties, the pair resolved to compete at the 2023 Canadian Championships, with Stellato explaining that "I want it so badly because I want it for Max so much, because this is his tenth Canadian championship and last year I was so proud, I was the first partner you got a medal with in senior. So, to be the partner that brings him the gold would be really special to me." They won the gold medal by a margin of 11.92 points over silver medalists McIntosh/Mimar.

Following the national championships, Stellato eventually recovered from the extended illness, and was assessed as being at "100% of her physical power" for a week in advance of the 2023 Four Continents Championships. They finished second in the short program despite her stepping out of their throw jump. The free skate proved somewhat more difficult, with Deschamps falling on an attempt at the triple Salchow jump. They were third in that segment, albeit with a new personal best score, and won the bronze medal. This was Stellato's first ISU championship medal in 23 years, to which she said "it means a lot to me to bring home hardware and I have all intention to continue until 2026."

Programs

Pairs with Deschamps for Canada

Pairs with Bartholomay for the United States

Women's singles for the United States

Competitive highlights 
GP: Grand Prix; CS: Challenger Series; JGP: Junior Grand Prix

Pairs with Deschamps for Canada

Pairs with Bartholomay for the United States

Women's singles for the United States

References

External links
 
 
 Deanna Stellato / Nathan Bartholomay at Ice Network

Navigation

Living people
American female single skaters
1983 births
Sportspeople from Park Ridge, Illinois
World Junior Figure Skating Championships medalists
American female pair skaters
21st-century American women
20th-century American women
Four Continents Figure Skating Championships medalists